This article contains lists of achievements in major senior-level international baseball and softball tournaments according to first-place, second-place and third-place results obtained by teams representing different nations. The objective is not to create combined medal tables; the focus is on listing the best positions achieved by teams in major international tournaments, ranking the nations according to the most number of podiums accomplished by teams of these nations.

Results
For the making of these lists, results from following major international tournaments were consulted:

 IBAF: International Baseball Federation
 IOC: International Olympic Committee
 ISF: International Softball Federation
 WBSC: World Baseball Softball Confederation

Medals for the demonstration events are NOT counted. Medals earned by athletes from defunct National Olympic Committees (NOCs) or historical teams are NOT merged with the results achieved by their immediate successor states. The International Olympic Committee (IOC) do NOT combine medals of these nations or teams.

The tables are pre-sorted by total number of first-place results, second-place results and third-place results, then most first-place results, second-place results, respectively. When equal ranks are given, nations are listed in alphabetical order.

Baseball and softball

Men and women

Men

Women

Baseball

Softball

See also
 WBSC World Rankings
 Major achievements in Olympic team ball sports by nation
 List of major achievements in sports by nation

Notes

References

General
Official results
 Baseball
 Men's Olympic tournament: Results
 Men's World Baseball Classic: About, Stats
 Men's WBSC Premier12: Past editions
 Women's Baseball World Cup: Past editions
 Softball
 Women's Olympic tournament: Results
 Men's Softball World Championship: Past editions
 Women's Softball World Championship: Past editions

Specific

External links
 World Baseball Softball Confederation (WBSC) – official website

Baseball and softball
Achievements
Achievements